The 1911 Massachusetts gubernatorial election took place on November 7, 1911. Incumbent Democratic Governor Eugene Foss defeated the Republican nominee, Louis A. Frothingham with 48.84% of the vote.

Primary elections were held on September 26, 1911. It was the first gubernatorial election where the nominees were chosen in primary elections.

Democratic primary

Candidates
Eugene Foss, incumbent Governor.
Thomas L. Hisgen, petroleum producer and the Massachusetts Independence League nominee for Governor in 1907.

Results

Republican primary

Candidates
Louis A. Frothingham, Lieutenant Governor of Massachusetts.
Joseph H. Walker, Speaker of the Massachusetts House of Representatives
Norman H. White, State Representative from Brookline

Results

General election

Results

Governor

Lieutenant Governor

See also
 1911 Massachusetts legislature

References

Bibliography

Governor
1911
Massachusetts
November 1911 events